Núi Gôi station is a railway station on North–South railway at Km 101 in Vietnam. The station is located in Vụ Bản, Nam Định between Trình Xuyên station and Cát Đằng station.

References 

Railway stations in Vietnam